Armatuš is a village in the municipality of Novaci, North Macedonia.

Demographics
Armatuš has traditionally and exclusively been populated by Muslim Albanians.

According to the 2021 census, the village had a total of 32 inhabitants. Ethnic groups in the village include:

Albanians 32

According to the 2002 census, the village had a total of 41 inhabitants. Ethnic groups in the village include:

Turks 25
Albanians 16

References

External links

Villages in Novaci Municipality
Albanian communities in North Macedonia